Zhuliao station, is a station of Line 14 of the Guangzhou Metro. It started operations on 28 December 2018. This will be a stop on the under construction Guangzhou–Foshan circular intercity railway.

Gallery

References

 Railway stations in China opened in 2018
 Guangzhou Metro stations in Baiyun District